Preston is an unincorporated community  located in Okmulgee County, Oklahoma, United States. The post office was established December 13, 1909. It was named for an Okmulgee oilman, Harry Preston.

First known as Hamilton Switch, and now unrecognizable from the past, Preston was once a highly prosperous community, thriving mainly from the oil boom, as did many of the surrounding communities.  Later on, as the oil industry quieted in Preston, it served as a station for restocking trains and running cattle trails, loading water from Frisco Lake. Many remnants of the station may be found throughout parts of Preston. Many old cattle trails and roads, though overgrown, are still distinguishable as such due to the heavy use and traffic.

It currently has two schools, three churches, a single gas station, feed store, a heating and air company, and a hair salon, as well as a fire protection business and the offices of Oklahoma Rural Water District No. 2.

Demographics

Education
Preston Public School is the school district serving the town.

Transportation
Preston is served by U.S. Route 75, a major national north/south artery for much of its length, currently running from the Canada–US border at Noyes, Minnesota to Dallas.

Preston is also on Old Highway 75, being the previous two-lane alignment of US-75 running north to Beggs and south to Okmulgee.

References

External links
 https://www.facebook.com/PrestonOKVFD Preston Volunteer Fire Department

Unincorporated communities in Okmulgee County, Oklahoma